Richard Guarasci (born January 14, 1946) was the 18th president of Wagner College in Staten Island, New York. He took office on June 1, 2002  and, as of July 1, 2016, was the college's longest-serving president. He held the rank of professor of political science and taught in the areas of democracy, citizenship and American diversity. Following Guarasci's retirement on June 30, 2019, he became Wagner College's third president emeritus.

Guarasci was appointed Wagner College's provost and vice president for academic affairs in February 1997. Before coming to Wagner, he was dean of Hobart College, part of Hobart and William Smith Colleges, in Geneva, New York and, earlier, a dean and faculty member at St. Lawrence University in Canton, New York.

Background

Education 
Born in 1946, Richard Guarasci graduated in 1963 from Cardinal Farley Military Academy in Rhinebeck, New York. He earned his Bachelor of Science degree in economics, with a minor in philosophy, from Fordham University in the Bronx, New York, in 1967; his Master of Arts degree in economics from Indiana University Bloomington in 1969; and his Ph.D. in political science from I.U. Bloomington in 1972.

Personal life 
Richard Guarasci was born and raised in the Flatbush neighborhood of Brooklyn, New York. In 1968, he married his high school sweetheart, Carin Marie Tomasuolo, who pursued a career in education, earning her doctorate from Columbia University Teachers College. They have two children. Bridget L. Guarasci, an anthropologist at Franklin & Marshall College in Lancaster, Pennsylvania, is married to attorney Mani S. Potnuru; they have a daughter, Zoe Amala Guarasci Potnuru. Patrick Guarasci, founder of the political consultancy G Strategies in Milwaukee, Wisconsin, is married to musician Hannah Gabriela “Gabby” Banuelos.

Wagner College career

Wagner Plan for the Practical Liberal Arts 
Richard Guarasci's first project upon becoming Wagner College's provost in 1997 was to work with faculty on a reconfiguration of the curriculum, which was called the Wagner Plan for the Practical Liberal Arts. The Wagner Plan still forms the core of Wagner College's unique approach to undergraduate education. The Wagner Plan has three key elements: (1) A freshman “learning community” (often abbreviated FYP, for first-year program) consists of a pair of classes from different disciplines, taught by two professors, with a third course called a “reflective tutorial” emphasizing writing. The FYP also includes a variety of “experiential learning” opportunities — sometimes field trips, sometimes community work projects. (2) An intermediate learning community (or ILC) consists of a pair of complementary courses from different disciplines taught by a two-professor team. (3) The senior learning community (or SLC) for graduating students in each department consists of a capstone course, a senior thesis or project, and a certain number of hours invested in either community work or an internship.

Port Richmond Partnership 
In 2009, President Richard Guarasci initiated a partnership between Wagner College and a variety of businesses, schools, churches and community organizations in the Staten Island community of Port Richmond, a high-needs black and Hispanic neighborhood about 3 miles from the college campus. The mission of the Port Richmond Partnership is to encourage sustainable relationships among members of the Port Richmond and Wagner College communities to enhance student learning and raise civic awareness, while also supporting collaborations that address significant challenges and establish measurable impacts in five high need areas: arts, education, health, economic development and immigration.

A project separate from but very closely connected to the Port Richmond Partnership is called 30,000 Degrees, indicating the additional number of 4-year college degrees the project hopes to generate among Staten Island residents over a 10-year period. The project, spearheaded in 2015 by Richard Guarasci, is a partnership between Wagner College and the other two institutions of higher learning on Staten Island, St. John's University and the College of Staten Island, a City University of New York affiliate. 30,000 Degrees focuses upon college readiness programs embedded in Staten Island public schools, beginning with high schools and extending later to intermediate and elementary schools. One of these college-readiness programs is the Port Richmond Partnership Leadership Academy. As part of the PRPLA program, cohorts live and study on the Wagner College campus each summer, and competitive scholarships are available to participants.

Building the endowment and the campus 
When Richard Guarasci first joined the Wagner College community, in 1997, the college's endowment was valued at $4 million. In January 2018, when Guarasci announced his plan to retire the following year, the endowment's value stood at $98.7 million.

During Guarasci's tenure as president, one new building was dedicated, and another was given a major refurbishment. Foundation Hall, the first new residence facility opened on the Wagner College campus since Harbor View Hall in 1969, welcomed its first residents in January 2010. Built at a cost of $24 million, it accommodates 200 students. And in October 2012, the college re-opened Main Hall after an 18-month, $15 million external restoration project. The collegiate gothic building, dedicated in 1930, is considered the architectural signature of the college.

Longest-serving Wagner College president 
At its October 2016 meeting, Wagner College's Board of Trustees recognized Richard Guarasci for his superior record of longevity as the institution's president. On July 1 of that year, Guarasci had become the longest-serving president in the college's history, having surpassed the previous record held by President Arthur Ole Davidson (14 standard 365-day years, 31 days, and 3 “leap days”). Davidson retired in 1975.

Leadership in higher education 
Chairman, Association of American Colleges and Universities board of directors 

Chairman and secretary of the board, Campus Compact 

President emeritus, Coalition of Urban and Metropolitan Universities 

Former chairman, New American Colleges & Universities 

Former chairman, New York State Higher Education Services Corporation 

In 2012, Richard Guarasci was one of 11 members of the National Task Force on Civic Learning and Democratic Engagement that produced a report, “A Crucible Moment: College Learning & Democracy’s Future,” published by the Association of American Colleges and Universities.

Select publications

Books 
“Democratic Education in the Age of Difference: Redefining Citizenship in Higher Education,” co-authored with Grant H. Cornwell and others (San Francisco: Jossey-Bass, 1997) 

"Neighborhood Democracy: Building Anchor Partnerships Between Colleges & Their Communities" (Sterling, VA: Stylus Pub, 2022)

Book chapter 
“Renewing the Civic Purpose of Liberal Education,” co-authored with Barry N. Checkoway and Peter L. Levine, in the book, “Transforming Undergraduate Education: Theory that Compels and Practices that Succeed,” edited by Donald W. Harward (Lanham, Md.: Rowman & Littlefield, 2011)

Articles 
“Developing the Democratic Arts,” in About Campus magazine (Feb. 2001), published by ACPA—College Student Educators International and Jossey-Bass

“On the Challenge of Becoming the Good College,” in Liberal Education magazine (Winter 2006, Vol. 92 No. 1), published by the Association of American Colleges and Universities

“Sustaining Transformation, Resiliency in Hard Times,” co-authored with Wagner College Provost Devorah Lieberman, in Change: The Magazine of Higher Education (Nov.-Dec. 2009), published by the Carnegie Foundation for the Advancement of Teaching

“Anchoring Democracy: The Civic Imperative for Higher Education,” in Liberal Education magazine (Winter 2018, Vol. 104 No. 1) ), published by the Association of American Colleges and Universities

References

Living people
American political scientists
Fordham University alumni
Wagner College people
1946 births